Just in Time is an album by American jazz pianist Larry Willis recorded in 1989 and released on the SteepleChase label.

Reception 

Allmusic's Michael G. Nastos said: "Here is trio jazz from a veteran pianist, one of the best in America".

Track listing
All compositions by Larry Willis except where noted
 "Just in Time" (Jule Styne, Betty Comden, Adolph Green) – 10:32
 "Soul Search" – 8:59
 "T's Bag Blues" – 5:20
 "For All We Know" (J. Fred Coots, Sam M. Lewis) – 9:39 Additional track on CD release
 "Solar" (Miles Davis) – 6:31 Additional track on CD release
 "Te Quiero Mi Hermand" – 10:01
 "The Island" (Ivan Lins, Vítor Martins) – 8:21
 "One Finger Snap" (Herbie Hancock) – 8:59

Personnel
Larry Willis – piano
Bob Cranshaw – bass
Kenny Washington – drums

References

SteepleChase Records albums
Larry Willis albums
1989 albums